"I Wanna Be With You" is a song by American singer Mandy Moore. It was released as the lead single from Moore's reissue of the same name (2000) on April 3, 2000. The song received positive reviews from critics. It peaked at number 24 in the United States Billboard Hot 100, becoming Moore's first and only top 30 single in the US to date. The song also peaked at number 13 in Australia and was certified Gold by ARIA. It also peaked at number 21 in the UK, 66 in Austria and 70 in Germany. The song was featured on the soundtrack to the 2000 film Center Stage. The music video for the song, directed by Nigel Dick, showed Moore singing the song to her love interest in a dance studio.

Composition
"I Wanna Be with You" is written in the key of E major and is set in the time signature of common time. It is moderately paced with a tempo of 76 beats per minute. The song also follows the sequence of Emaj7–A–E7–Amaj7 as its chord progression. Moore's vocals in the song spans from the note of A3 to D5. The version used in the film has more poppy beats.

Reception
Billboard magazine praised the song and said, "Top 40 programmers and listeners alike will love Moore more with this track...just delightful", and AllMusic chose the song as a highlight track on the parent album.

Chart performance
The single was released in April 2000 and soon became Moore's highest-charting song in the US, reaching number 24, becoming her only top-40 song in the nation. It spent 16 weeks on the Billboard Hot 100 and peaked during its ninth week on the chart. In Australia, the single reached number 13 on the ARIA Singles Chart and spent 19 weeks in the top 50. It also peaked at number 21 in the United Kingdom, becoming her second single to chart there.

Track listings

Australian maxi-CD single
 "I Wanna Be with You" – 4:12
 "Let Me Be the One" – 3:48
 "Candy" (Rhythm Masters club mix) – 7:35
 "I Wanna Be with You" (Soul Solution remix extended) – 10:16

European CD1
 "I Wanna Be with You" (radio edit) – 4:12
 "I Wanna Be with You" (Soul Solution remix radio edit) – 4:21

European CD2
 "I Wanna Be with You" (radio edit) – 4:12
 "I Wanna Be with You" (Soul Solution remix extended) – 10:16
 "Candy" (Rhythm Masters club mix) – 7:35

UK CD1
 "I Wanna Be with You" – 4:12
 "Let Me Be the One" – 3:48
 "Love Shot" – 4:23

UK CD2
 "I Wanna Be with You" – 4:12
 "I Wanna Be with You" (Soul Solution remix radio edit) – 4:21
 "Candy" (Wade Robson remix) – 7:35
 "I Wanna Be with You" (video)

UK cassette single
 "I Wanna Be with You" – 4:12
 "Let Me Be the One" – 3:48

Credits and personnel
Credits are adapted from the I Wanna Be with You liner notes.
 Writing – Shelly Peiken, Tiffany Arbuckle
 Writing, production, arrangement – Keith Thomas
 Lead vocals – Mandy Moore
 Backing vocals – Tiffany Arbuckle
 Bass guitar, acoustic guitar, drum programming, synthesizer – Keith Thomas
 Electric guitar – Jerry McPhershon, Kenny Greenberg
 Engineering assistant – Hadyn Buxton
 Engineering, mixing – Bill Whittington
 Production coordination, Pro Tools – Shaun Shankel
 Additional programming – Dan Muckala

Charts

Weekly charts

Year-end charts

Certifications

Release history

References

2000 singles
2000 songs
2000s ballads
Epic Records singles
Mandy Moore songs
Music videos directed by Nigel Dick
Pop ballads
Song recordings produced by Keith Thomas (record producer)
Songs written by Keith Thomas (record producer)
Songs written by Plumb (singer)
Songs written by Shelly Peiken
Songs written for films